The 2019−20 Coppa Italia Serie D was the 21st edition of Coppa Italia Serie D. Due to the COVID-19 pandemic in Italy, on 20 May 2020, Lega Nazionale Dilettanti decided not to complete the competition.

Format 
All rounds of the event, with the exception of the semi-finals, are a single-match direct elimination. For these matches, in the event of a draw at the end of the 90 minute regulation time, penalty shootout is used to determine the winning team (no extra time is played). The home factor is determined by drawing lots in the preliminary round, in the first round and in round 64. In the round of 32, in the round of 16 and in the quarter-finals, however, the team that played away in the previous round plays at home. The other way around, proceeding with the draw only in the case of a match between two teams that have both played at home, or both away, in the previous round, the final is instead played at a neutral ground. The semi-finals are organized in home and away matches, with a draw to determine the order of the fields and with the application of the away goal rule. In the return matches there are no extra times but direct penalties in the event of a score that determines a draw in both overall goals and away goals. The match schedule is guided by criteria of geographical proximity.

Calendar 
The calendar of the competition was announced on 6 August 2019.

Preliminary Round 
Ties were played between 18 August 2019 and 11 September 2019

They participated in the round:

 36 teams promoted from 2018−19 Eccellenza
 18 winners of 2018–19 Serie D Relegation play-out
teams that avoided relegation by <8 points
26 clubs ranked at the end of the 2018–19 Serie D in twelfth, eleventh and tenth place in the related 18-team groups, thirteenth, twelfth and eleventh of the 19-team groups, fourteenth, thirteenth and twelfth in the 20-team groups
4 supernumerary teams (Palermo, Lucchese, Arzachena and Foggia)
2 teams with worst scores Coppa Disciplina C.U. n.166 del 27/6/2019

First Round 
Ties were played between 24 August 2019 and 2 October 2019

They participated in the round:

 47 teams winner of preliminary round
 63 teams, who give a bye for the preliminary round

Round of 64 
Ties were played between 18 September 2019 and 9 October 2019.

Round of 32 
Ties were played between 9 October 2019 and 30 October 2019.

Round of 16 
Ties were played between 13 November 2019 and 20 November 2019.

Quarter-finals 
Ties were played between 4 December 2019 and 11 December 2019.

Semi-finals 
Ties of first legs were played on 29 January 2020. Second leg tie of Folgore Caratese vs. Sanremese was not played due to Sanremese fielding an ineligible player in the first leg.

First leg

Second leg

Final

References 

Coppa Italia Serie D
2019−20 Coppa Italia Serie D